Harald Høffding (11 March 1843 – 2 July 1931) was a Danish philosopher and theologian.

Life

Born and educated in Copenhagen, he became a schoolmaster, and ultimately in 1883 a professor at the University of Copenhagen. He was strongly influenced by Søren Kierkegaard in his early development, but later became a positivist, retaining and combining with it the spirit and method of practical psychology and the critical school.  The  physicist Niels Bohr studied philosophy from and became a friend of Høffding. The philosopher and author Ágúst H. Bjarnason was a student of Høffding.

Høffding's great-nephew was the statistician Wassily Hoeffding.

Høffding died in Copenhagen.

Work

His best-known work is perhaps his Den nyere Filosofis Historie (1894), translated into English from the German edition (1895) by B.E. Meyer as History of Modern Philosophy (2 vols., 1900), a work intended by him to supplement and correct that of Hans Brøchner, to whom it is dedicated. His Psychology, the Problems of Philosophy (1905) and Philosophy of Religion (1906) also have appeared in English.

Among Høffding's other writings, most of which have been translated into German, are: Den engelske Filosofi i vor Tid (1874); Etik (1876); Psychologi i Omrids paa Grundlag af Erfaring (ed. 1892); Psykologiske Undersøgelser (1889); Charles Darwin (1889); Kontinuiteten i Kants filosofiske Udviklingsgang (1893); Det psykologiske Grundlag for logiske Domme (1899); Rousseau und seine Philosophie (1901); Mindre Arbejder (1899).

Selected publications
Harald Høffding, 1891 
Harald Hoffding, 1906 
Harald Høffding, 1919 
Harald Høffding, 1920

References

Sources

External links

 
  
 
 Presentation of Harald Høffding, in portuguese

1843 births
1931 deaths
Danish philosophers
Danish schoolteachers
University of Copenhagen alumni
Academic staff of the University of Copenhagen
People from Copenhagen
Rectors of the University of Copenhagen
Spinoza scholars
Corresponding Fellows of the British Academy